Theodore Thomas is an American film director and producer. He is the son of Disney animator Frank Thomas.

His films include the 1983 film Where the Toys Come From, the documentary about the two last Disney "Nine Old Men" animators, Frank and Ollie (1995), and Walt & El Grupo (2008), documenting Disney and his group visiting South America during World War II.

In 2012, Thomas produced another documentary about Disney animators, Growing up with Nine Old Men (included in the Diamond edition of the Peter Pan DVD.)

See also 
Don Hahn-also makes documentaries about Disney
Waking Sleeping Beauty

References

External links 

Living people
Year of birth missing (living people)
Disney people